Hassane Illiassou (born 22 September 1966) is a former Nigerien sprinter who competed in the men's 100m competition at the 1992 Summer Olympics. He recorded a 10.73, not enough to qualify for the next round past the heats. His personal best is 10.30, set in 1994.

References

1966 births
Living people
Nigerien male sprinters
Athletes (track and field) at the 1992 Summer Olympics
Olympic athletes of Niger
World Athletics Championships athletes for Niger